Amerila piepersii is a moth of the subfamily Arctiinae. It was described by Snellen in 1879. It is found in Indonesia (Sulawesi, Buton, Sula, Mongolei).

References

 , 1879: Lepidoptera van Celebes, verzameld door Mr. M.C.Piepers, met aanteekeningen en beschrijving der nieuwe soorten. Tijdschrift voor Entomologie 22: 61-126, pl. 6-10.

Moths described in 1879
Amerilini
Moths of Indonesia